Omega is a Big Finish Productions audio drama based on the long-running British science fiction television series Doctor Who.

Plot
Jolly Chronolidays is offering sight-seeing tours of the "Sector of Forgotten Souls", the place where in ancient times the Time Lord Omega detonated a star that enabled the Time Lords the power to travel through time, and was lost. When the Fifth Doctor arrives, he discovers that Omega might not be as lost as was thought.

Cast
The Doctor — Peter Davison
Omega — Ian Collier
Professor Ertikus — Patrick Duggan
Glinda — Anita Elias
Maven — Faith Kent
Daland — Hugo Myatt
Sentia — Caroline Munro
Zagreus — Jim Sangster
Tarpov — Conrad Westmaas

Continuity
This story is part of a trilogy with Davros and Master to celebrate the 40th anniversary of Doctor Who.
Also, this story directly follows, and acts as a sequel to the TV story Arc of Infinity, where Omega takes the Doctor's form.
Tegan and Nyssa are not in this story.  In The Elite it is revealed that they are staying at the hostel in Amsterdam, seen in Arc of Infinity.
Omega first appeared in The Three Doctors.
The hologram foreshadows Zagreus.
Lurmans were seen in Carnival of Monsters.
The elephants' graveyard for TARDISes that is mentioned here is finally seen at the end of The Axis of Insanity.

Cast notes
Conrad Westmaas would later play C'rizz, a companion of the Eighth Doctor.

External links
Big Finish Productions – Omega

2003 audio plays
Fifth Doctor audio plays
Gallifrey audio plays